Barby is a commune in the Ardennes department in the Grand Est region of northern France.

The inhabitants of the commune are known as Barbyons or Barbyonnes.

The commune has been awarded three flowers by the National Council of Towns and Villages in Bloom in the Competition of cities and villages in Bloom.

Geography

Barby is located immediately north-west of Rethel and immediately south-east of Château-Porcien. Access to the commune is by the D926 road from Rethel which passes through the heart of the commune and the village before continuing north-west to Château-Porcien. The D946 from Rethel passes through the north of the commune as it goes north-west to Seraincourt. The commune is entirely farmland.

The Aisne river passes through the south-east of the commune forming a small part of the south-eastern border as it flows west to eventually join the Oise at Compiègne. The Vaux river flows south, forming the western border of the commune, to join the Aisne just outside the south-western tip of the commune. The Ruisseau de Bourgeron flows from the north-east through the commune and the village and joins the Aisne on the southern border. The Canal des Ardennes is parallel to and south of the Aisne and forms a small portion of the southern border of the commune.

Climate
July and August are very hot and dry with temperatures up to 38 °C. Even so, rainfall is more frequent in summer, but the winters are shorter and less severe. The cold weather lasts only from October to March which favours corn crops and especially Kitchen gardens.

History

Excavations have uncovered a Bronze Age tomb in Barby and the village is traversed by the old Roman road from Rethel to Château-Porcien.

The village of Gerson was located on the current territory of the commune in the Middle Ages but is now gone. It was at Gerson that Jean Charlier de Gerson, Chancellor of the University of Paris (nicknamed Doctor Christianissimus), was born in 1363. A Wayside cross marks the place which traditionally is his birthplace. The commune named the Rue Gerson after him and the parish built a monument in the church during its construction in 1880 or 1881.

Barby appears as Barby on the 1750 Cassini Map and the same on the 1790 version.

Administration

List of Successive Mayors

Demography
In 2017 the commune had 415 inhabitants.

Economy
Barby is a rural commune characterised by agriculture. The wheat harvest wheat is a highlight of life in the commune.

Sites and Monuments

The Church of Saint John the Baptist dates from 1880. The Church contains many items that are registered as historical objects:
A Baptismal font (15th century)
2 Statues: Virgin of Pity and Saints John the Baptist and John the Evangelist (15th century)
A Painting: The beheading of Saint John the Baptist (15th century)
An Altar and Retable (15th century)
A Statue: Saint Barbe (16th century)
A Statue: Saint John the Baptist (17th century)
A Statue: Saint Hubert (17th century)
A Funeral Plaque for Elisabeth la Chardenière, mother of Jean Gerson (16th century)
La Crauye, a chalk quarry north of the village.
Les Bœufs Blancs (The White Oxen), a beach on the Aisne.

Notable people linked to the commune
Jean Charlier de Gerson (1363-1429), Chancellor of the University of Paris.
Gérard Tène (or Thène), a labourer at Barby in 1644 and his son, Joseph Taine - also a labourer at Barby, were the ancestors of Hippolyte Taine.
Eugène Marquigny, a Jesuit and writer born in 1836 at Barby.
Guy Féquant, writer, born in 1949 at Barby

See also
Communes of the Ardennes department

References

Communes of Ardennes (department)